Rack 'Em Up is a Billiards/Pool arcade game developed by Konami in 1987 with two game types: 9-Ball or Rotation.

The Japanese title of the game is "The Hustler".

Reception & Legacy 

In Japan, Game Machine listed Rack 'Em Up on their January 1, 1988 issue as being the ninth most-successful table arcade unit of the month.

Rack 'Em Up was made available by Microsoft for its Game Room service for the Xbox 360 and Games for Windows – Live in May 2010.

References

External links
 
 Rack 'Em Up at Arcade History

1987 video games
Arcade video games
Cue sports video games
Konami games
Konami arcade games
Video games developed in Japan